For the 1928 film starring Lon Chaney, Lionel Barrymore and Warner Baxter, see West of Zanzibar (1928 film)

West of Zanzibar is a 1954 British adventure film directed by Harry Watt and starring Anthony Steel, Sheila Sim and Edric Connor.

It is a sequel to Where No Vultures Fly (1951), from the same director and producer, and continues the adventures of game warden Bob Payton, played again by Anthony Steel. The subject of the film is ivory smuggling, and although the film appears to side with the African natives against economic exploitation, it was banned by the government of Kenya, which considered its approach too paternalistic.

Plot
The rural African Galana tribe move to Mombasa following a drought. The tribe's peaceful ways are destroyed by the influence of illegal ivory traders. Game warden Bob Payton turns detective, travelling to Zanzibar to discover the ringleader behind the ivory smuggling. Payton tracks his quarry through some of the most treacherous passages of the Zanzibar territory. Despite obstacles which include crocodiles and rhinos, Payton finally corners the villain. The gang's ringleader has given an African tribe land in return for ivory tusks, but he is repaid for his scheming when the tribe turns on him.

Cast
 Anthony Steel as Bob Payton
 Sheila Sim as Mary Payton
 Edric Connor as Ushington
 Orlando Martins as M'Kwongi
 William Simons as Tim Payton
 Martin Benson as Dhofar
 David Osieli as Ambrose
 Bethlehem Sketch as Bethlehem
 Peter Illing as Yhingoni
 Edward Johnson as Halfbreed
 Juma as Juma
 Howard Marion-Crawford as Wood
 Stuart Lindsell as Colonel Ryan
 Sheik Abdullah as Dhow captain
 Alan Webb as Senior official

Production
Where No Vultures Fly had been one of the biggest hits at the British box office in 1951 so Ealing Studios decided to make a sequel with the same star, director and producer, and again in association with the Schlesinger Organisation. Dinah Shearing was replaced by Sheila Sim. At one stage it was planned for the film to be shot in 3-D but this did not happen.

Like the first film, it was shot on location in Africa. The unit arrived in Nairobi in January 1953.

It was one of the few films Steel made at his peak where he was not in support of an older male actor.

Soundtrack
A popular local dance song during the shoot was a Swahili folk song called "Jambo Sigara Baridl". The filmmakers liked the melody so much they decided to include it as background music. Then it was decided to prepare an English version of the song, with Anthony Steel singing lead vocals, along with a band, the Radio Revellers. When asked if he could sing, Steel replied, "Apart from making gurgling noises in the bath, I've never tried." Steel recorded the song anyway and it was a success on the charts.

Release
Kenya's film censors banned the film on the grounds it would hurt race relations in the country.

The film was also banned in India after the protests of African students in that country.

Reception

Box office
Universal distributed the film in the US. They opened it at the World Theatre in New York, which tended to show exploitation films – it was an experiment to have the film considered as an exploitation one as opposed to something arthouse, which was the traditional market for British movies in America. The experiment was not a success. The film still ended up taking $400,000 in the US with over 10,000 bookings.

In 1957, the film was listed as among the seventeen most popular movies the Rank Organisation ever released in the US.

Critical reception
Variety said "The yarn is developed as a strong adventure meller in which native customs and rivalries play 
an important part. There is a brief attempt to point a moral which, well-meaning though it may be, appears a little fatuous on the screen. "

Bosley Crowther wrote in The New York Times, "it is an exciting and generally creditable picture of a contemporary aspect of East Africa."

BFI Screenonline later wrote:
West of Zanzibar was designed to capitalise on its predecessor's success but the actual film, and its history with audiences, couldn't be more different. Harry Watt... managed to maintain the fun pace, beautiful cinematography and focus on wildlife that made the first film so popular, but West of Zanzibar has one key difference: its subject. It replaces the worthy concerns for animal welfare in Where No Vultures Fly with a more contentious humanitarian question – the displacement of rural African tribes and their participation in ivory poaching. But it completely fudges the answer... Watt was reportedly taken aback, but the Kenyan Board's decision made explicit the film's problematic depictions of racial politics. West of Zanzibar has since disappeared from public view, and remains one of the least known Ealing titles.
Sky Movies noted: "Anthony Steel once again as the game warden Bob Payton. He shares the Hollywood hero's ability to come through the most vicious fight with no more than a spotless handkerchief tied around one bulging bicep."

TV Guide wrote, "relying too much on its scenic African location, this British adventure moves along slowly."

References

External links

West of Zanzibar at BFI Screenonline
West of Zanzibar at Letterbox DVD
West of Zanzibar at Colonial Film
West of Zanzibar at BFI
West of Zanzibar at TCMDB
Review of film at Variety

1954 films
British adventure films
Ealing Studios films
1954 adventure films
Films directed by Harry Watt
Films about hunters
Films set in Kenya
Films shot in Kenya
Films shot in Tanzania
British sequel films
Films with screenplays by Jack Whittingham
1950s English-language films
1950s British films